The 2022 San Diego Wave FC season is San Diego Wave FC's inaugural season as a professional women's soccer team. It plays in the National Women's Soccer League.

Background 

In January 2021, Lisa Baird, commissioner of the National Women's Soccer League, announced that an expansion team in Sacramento, California, led by Pittsburgh Penguins owner Ron Burkle and in conjunction with Sacramento Republic FC's expansion bid into Major League Soccer, would join the NWSL in 2022. However, Burkle never confirmed the news publicly before exiting the Sacramento Republic's ownership group. Instead, on June 8, 2021, the NWSL announced San Diego as the location for an expansion team owned by Burkle to begin play in 2022. Burkle named co-investor Matt Alvarez as his representative in the NWSL project.

The club hired former United States women's national soccer team coach Jill Ellis, who had retired from coaching after winning her second, and the United States's fourth, FIFA Women's World Cup championship. Ellis said Burkle had sought her advice about NWSL expansion in 2021. Ellis relocated from Miami, Florida, to San Diego for the job, and described her involvement in soccer matters at the club as "minimal"; she said most of her time was spent on club business and operations. By April 1, 2021, the club had hired 45 employees.

On July 12, 2021, the Wave announced Ellis's hiring of Molly Downtain, a former United States women's national team administrator who worked with Ellis from 2015 to 2019, as general manager.

On July 14, 2021, Ellis announced the hiring of former England women's national football team captain and Manchester United W.F.C. manager Casey Stoney as the Wave's first head coach. Stoney subsequently hired Rich Gunney from Portland Thorns FC and Victoria Boardman from Beach FC as assistants familiar with the NWSL and collegiate talent. Stoney had also been named Manchester United's first manager for the women's side, making the Wave the second club with no prior roster or staff that she had managed; she led United to a  record as manager from 2018 to 2021, including the FA Women's Championship title and promotion to the Women's Super League in 2019. Stoney cited the building process as part of her motivation to join the Wave, and noted that the Wave was a standalone organization, not a smaller division of a men's side as United had been. Visa issues required Stoney to leave her partner and children in England for the job.

The team revealed its crest and colors on December 15, 2021.

Stadium 
The team began play at 6,000-capacity Torero Stadium, on the campus of the University of San Diego, for the 2022 NWSL Challenge Cup and the first nine home matches of the 2022 National Women's Soccer League season. Torero also served as the venue for the previous professional women's soccer team in San Diego, the San Diego Spirit of the Women's United Soccer Association, from 2001 to 2003. The team scheduled its last two regular season home matches at Snapdragon Stadium, which opened in September 2022 in the Mission Valley campus extension of San Diego State University, and announced in December 2021 that Snapdragon Stadium would become the club's permanent home.

The Wave train at Surf Sports Park in Del Mar, California. Neighbors of the park commented in public meetings with concerns about the Wave's training as a sign of overcommitment of public space to sports usage, including traffic, dust, noise, and signage complaints.

Team

Squad

Competitions

Regular season 
The Wave opened their first regular season with a 1–0 road win over Houston Dash, with Jodie Taylor scoring the club's first regular-season goal in the 87th minute. The Dash's coach and general manager, James Clarkson, had been suspended prior to the match pending league and team investigations into complaints of discrimination and harassment, making Stoney the NWSL's manager with the longest uninterrupted tenure prior to her first match as San Diego's manager. The Wave's regular season home opener on May 7, 2022, at Torero Stadium was a 4–0 win over NJ/NY Gotham FC, with the venue sold out of 5,000 tickets. Wave FC's Snapdragon Stadium opener on September 17, a 1–0 win over Angel City FC, was a sellout of 32,000, setting a new NWSL single-game attendance record.

Regular season standings

Results summary

Results by matchday

Playoffs

NWSL Challenge Cup 

The team conceded five goals within 15 minutes of the start of four of its matches. The club's first victory in any competition was on April 2, 2022, a 4–2 win against fellow Californian expansion team Angel City FC.

Divisional standings

Squad statistics

Goalscorers

Shutouts

Awards

NWSL Monthly Awards

Player of the Month

Rookie of the Month

Team of the Month

NWSL Weekly Awards

Player of the Week

Save of the Week

Transactions

2022 NWSL Expansion Draft 

The 2022 NWSL Expansion Draft was held on December 16, 2021. Blue highlights indicate United States federation players.

2022 NWSL Draft 
Draft picks are not automatically signed to the team roster. The 2022 NWSL Draft was held on December 18, 2021.

Transfers in

Transfers out

Preseason trialists 
Trialists are non-rostered invitees during preseason and are not automatically signed. The Wave released their preseason roster on January 31, 2022.

References

See also 
 2022 National Women's Soccer League season
 2022 in American soccer

San Diego Wave FC
San Diego Wave FC
2022 in sports in California